My Greatest Adventure was a DC Comics comic book that began in 1955 and is best known for introducing the superhero team Doom Patrol.

Publication history
The title was originally an anthology series with adventure stories told in the first person narrative.  Over time the types of stories changed from simple adventure to science fiction. With issue #80 (June 1963), the anthology format was dropped and replaced with stories featuring the Doom Patrol.  Issue #85 was the last to bear the My Greatest Adventure title; the series was renamed The Doom Patrol going forward from issue #86.

Issues #80-85 were reprinted as part of The Doom Patrol Archives, Vol. 1 (2002).

Contributors

Writers
Arnold Drake
Bob Haney

Artists
Mort Meskin
Jim Mooney
Ruben Moreira
Bruno Premiani
John Prentice
Alex Toth

2011 revival
A six issue revival of the series debuted in October 2011, written by Aaron Lopresti, Kevin Maguire, and Matt Kindt as a follow-up to the earlier Weird Worlds miniseries. It was an anthology featuring three different stories in each issue, Garbageman, Tanga, and Robotman.

Homage
A reference to My Greatest Adventure appears in Teen Titans Go! #28. When the Titans and Doom Patrol put together a birthday party for Beast Boy, members of the Doom Patrol tell the Titans some of their past adventures when Beast Boy was a member, including when they fought Animal-Vegetable-Mineral Man. Page 10-12 retells the story, and features a mock cover of My Greatest Adventure.

In the last volume of Teen Titans prior to The New 52, the formerly insane Steve Dayton is shown in #36 as slowly recovering, but still addicted to his helmet. While under a creative streak induced by the device he starts working on an autobiography, mostly based on his Doom Patrol years, which he plans to call My Greatest Adventure.

External links
My Greatest Adventures at Mike's Amazing World of Comics 
My Greatest Adventure at Cover Browser

Comics by Arnold Drake
DC Comics titles